Drut (द्रुत; also called drut laya) is the concluding section, in fast tempo (or laya), between 160 and 320 beats per minute, of the performance of a vocal raga in Hindustani classical music.

See also
 
Khyal
Vilambit
Madhyalaya
Hindustani classical music

Hindustani music terminology